WWTB is a Rhythmic contemporary formatted broadcast radio station licensed to Bristol, Virginia, serving the Tri-Cities. WWTB is owned and operated by Bristol Broadcasting Company.

On May 26, 2017, WFHG changed their format from talk to urban contemporary, branded as "105.3 The Beat", under new WWTB calls. Since then, the station has shifted to Rhythmic contemporary, adding rhythmic pop tracks while maintaining a Hip-Hop lean.

Translator
In addition to the main station, WWTB is relayed by FM translators to widen its broadcast area.

Previous logo

References

External links

1947 establishments in Virginia
Rhythmic contemporary radio stations in the United States
Radio stations established in 1947
WTB (AM)